The Moyie River is a  long tributary of the Kootenai River (spelled Kootenay River in Canada) in the U.S. state of Idaho and the Canadian province of British Columbia. The Moyie River is part of the Columbia River basin, being a tributary of the Kootenay River, which is tributary to the Columbia River.

Course
The Moyie River originates in southeast British Columbia. It flows northeast and east, collecting many headwater streams, before turning south and entering Moyie Lake. The river exits Moyie Lake to the south, flowing south and west by the village of Yahk, British Columbia, and Yahk Provincial Park before entering Idaho at Kingsgate, British Columbia, and Eastport, Idaho.

In Idaho, the Moyie River flows nearly due south, emptying into the Kootenai River near Moyie Springs, Idaho, several miles east of Bonners Ferry, Idaho. Near its mouth, the Moyie River tumbles over Moyie Falls. Near the falls is Moyie Dam, constructed in 1949.

The river has several oddly named pairs of tributaries. South of Moyie Lake the river collects the tributaries of Sunrise Creek and then Sundown Creek. Farther south, it collects Irishman Creek and then Englishman Creek. At Yahk, Hawkins Creek joins the Moyie River. Hawkins Creek has two tributaries that begin in the United States and flow north into Canada: Canuck Creek and America Creek. Another odd name occurring along the river is the town of Good Grief, Idaho.

The river is paralleled by the Crowsnest Highway in British Columbia, and, briefly, U.S. Route 95 in Idaho. The river is also paralleled by railroads: the Union Pacific in Idaho and the Canadian Pacific in British Columbia.

In Idaho, the Moyie River and its tributaries lie almost entirely within Kaniksu National Forest.

Natural history
Moyie Falls, near the mouth of the river, effectively blocks the migration of fish. In addition, various dams on the Kootenay River block fish migration. There are resident Kokanee salmon in the upper Moyie River and in Moyie Lake. These were introduced during the 1940s and since then naturalized.

History
According to British Columbia's Geographical Names Information System, the word "Moyie" is a corruption of the French "mouiller" or "mouillé", a name given by fur trappers referring to the wet conditions, also described by David Thompson in 1808. Thompson called the river "McDonald's River". Governor Simpson called it "Grand Quête River". Captain Palliser called it "Choe-coos River". The name "Moyie" was originally pronounced "moo-YAY", indicating its French origin, but today is commonly pronounced "mo-YAY". In 1923 the Eileen dam (previously known as the Moyie dam) was constructed where Skin Creek enters the river about five miles upstream of Moyie Falls.  It was anchored to a weak rock structure which washed away in 1925 due to flooding. The arch still remains intact.

According to the USGS, variant names for the Moyie River include: Methow, Mojie, Mooyie, and Moyea.

Recreation
The Moyie River has multiple recreation opportunities including camping, hunting, fishing, hiking, gold panning, canoeing, kayaking and white water rafting. At this time, recreational boaters do not need a permit to float the Moyie River. Information about current water flows is available through the United States Geological Survey.

See also

 List of rivers in Idaho
 List of longest streams of Idaho
 List of British Columbia rivers
 Moyie Falls
 Moyie River Canyon Bridge
 Tributaries of the Columbia River

References

Rivers of Boundary County, Idaho
Regional District of Central Kootenay
Regional District of East Kootenay
Rivers of Idaho
Rivers of British Columbia
East Kootenay
International rivers of North America
Tributaries of the Kootenay River